Susskind (German Süßkind "sweet child", variants Suskind, Suskin, Siskind, Ziskind, Ziskin, etc.) is a Jewish surname of German origin.

History
Süsskind in the German medieval period was a given name, not a surname, specifically recorded as carried by Jews since the early 13th century. A Jew named Süsskind is recorded as a physician in the hospital of Würzburg in 1218.

Süsskind, the Jew of Trimberg (Middle High German Sueskint der Jude von Trimperg) is one of the minnesingers whose work is compiled in the early-14th-century Codex Manesse. This poet is otherwise unknown, and there is no proof that the poems recorded under his name are from a single author, but the language of the poems is consistent with an author of the second half of the 13th century native to the Rhineland. There is also a Jewish motif in V.2,  where the poet proclaims his intention to leave the courtly sphere and live humbly "in the manner of old Jews", besides   possible allusions to Hebrew prayers in I.3.

Süsskind remained a widely-used given name among German-speaking Jews into the 19th century.
Beginning in the 18th century, some Jews adopted Süsskind as a patronymic surname.
Süsskind ceased to be used as a given name around mid-19th-century.

The baronial family of Süßkind is descended from Johann Gottlieb Süßkind, a cousin of theologian Friedrich Gottlieb Süskind, who was given the title of nobility by the king of Bavaria in 1821. The family is descended from one  Michael Süßkind, recorded as a citizen of Esslingen in 1425.

The surname was introduced to the United States by the 1880s.

People with the given name
Süsskind of Trimberg, 13th-century minnesinger
Alexander Süsskind of Grodno (d. 1794), Russian kabbalist
Süsskind Raschkow (d. 1836), German poet
Jekutiel-Süßkind Cohen, rabbi, father of Raphael Cohen (Rafael ben Jekutiel Süsskind Kohen, 1722–1803),  Chief Rabbi of Altona-Hamburg-Wandsbek

People with the surname
Susskind
 Arthur Susskind (1886–1967), American boxer
 Fred Susskind (1891–1957), South African Test cricketer
 Walter Susskind (1913–1980), Czech conductor
 David Susskind (1920–1987), American producer and talk show host
 Leonard Susskind (b. 1940), American theoretical physicist and father of string theory
 Lawrence Susskind (b. 1947), American dispute mediator
 Richard Susskind (b. 1961), British legal and IT adviser
 Steve Susskind (1942-2005), American actor and singer

Suskind 
 Richard Suskind (1925–1999), American writer convicted of fraud
 Ron Suskind (b. 1959), American author and investigative journalist

Süskind  
 Friedrich Gottlieb Süskind (1767–1829), German Protestant theologian 
 Walter Süskind (1906–1945), German Holocaust victim
 Wilhelm Emanuel Süskind (1901–1970), German author 
 Patrick Süskind (b. 1946) German writer and screenwriter, son of Wilhelm Emanuel Süskind

See also
 Süskind (film), 2012 Dutch film about Walter Süskind (1906–1945)
Topics named after Leonard Susskind
 Smolin–Susskind debate
 Kogut–Susskind fermion
 Susskind–Glogower operator
 Fischler–Susskind mechanism
 Susskind–Hawking battle
Sussman
Süß
Jud Süß (1940 film)

References

Ricarda Bauschke, "Süßkind von Trimberg – Ein jüdischer Autor in der Manessischen Handschrift" in:  Schulze (ed.), Juden in der deutschen Literatur des Mittelalters, Tübingen (2002).
Robert Singerman, Jewish Given Names and Family Names: A New Bibliography (2001), p. 222.

Jewish surnames